Rineloricaria maacki is a species of catfish in the family Loricariidae. It is native to South America, where it occurs in the Iguazu River in the Paraná River basin in Brazil. It is typically found in environments characterized by muddy and medium-to-fast-flowing water, a substrate composed primarily of sand, and little to no marginal vegetation. The species reaches 13.6 cm (5.4 inches) in standard length and is believed to be a facultative air-breather. Its specific name honors Reinhard Maack for his contributions to the geological knowledge of the Iguazu basin.

References 

 	

Loricariini
Fish described in 2008